Maximilien Lambert Gelissen (27 February 1786 - 19 March 1867), born in Brussels in 1867, was a pupil of a certain Rubens of Brussels for drawing, and of Henri Van Assche for painting. He painted mainly landscapes and genre paintings. His works are kept in many collections, including the Royal Museums of Fine Arts of Belgium and the Museum of Fine Arts, Ghent. In 1820 he won the prize for landscape from the Royal Academy of Science, Letters and Fine Arts of Belgium.

Notes

1786 births
1867 deaths
Artists from Brussels
Belgian painters